SPDT may refer to:

Single pole, double throw, a simple type of changeover electrical switch
Single Point Diamond Turning, a type of mechanical machining using diamond-tipped cutting elements
SCSI Pass-Through Direct, (SPTD) is a proprietary device driver and application programming interface (API)